Dark Winds is an American psychological thriller television series created by Graham Roland based on the Leaphorn & Chee novel series by Tony Hillerman. It premiered on AMC and AMC+ on June 12, 2022, with the first season consisting of six episodes. After its premiere, the series was renewed for a six-episode second season, which will premiere in 2023.

Premise 
The series follows two Navajo police officers, Joe Leaphorn and Jim Chee, in the 1970s Southwest. The first season is primarily based on Listening Woman (1978) and parts of People of Darkness (1980).

Cast and characters

Main 
 Zahn McClarnon as Joe Leaphorn, a veteran tribal police lieutenant based in Kayenta, a town in Navajo County.
 Kiowa Gordon as Jim Chee, an undercover FBI agent who becomes Leaphorn's newest deputy.
 Jessica Matten as Bernadette Manuelito, a Navajo tribal police sergeant who is sharp as a tack and works closely with Leaphorn.
 Deanna Allison as Emma Leaphorn, Leaphorn's wife and a nurse.
 Rainn Wilson as Dan "Devoted Dan" DeMarco, a degenerate missionary and used-car dealer who relies on his faith to recruit followers.
 Elva Guerra as Sally Growing Thunder, a pregnant teenager who is taken in by the Leaphorns.
 Jeremiah Bitsui as James Tso / Hoski, a secretive Navajo priest.
 Eugene Brave Rock as Frank Nakai, a Vietnam War veteran and member of the Buffalo Society, an extremist group.
 Noah Emmerich as Leland Whitover, a burned-out FBI agent whose career is dying and Chee's handler.

Recurring 
 Jonathan Adams as Lester
 Rob Tepper as Pete Samuels
 Ryan Begay as Guy Atcitty
 Amelia Rico as Ada Growing Thunder

Episodes

Production

Development 
In July 2021, it was announced that AMC had greenlighted Dark Winds for a six-episode order. The series is created by Graham Roland, who executive produces with Zahn McClarnon, George R. R. Martin, Robert Redford, Tina Elmo, Vince Gerardis, Vince Calandra, and Chris Eyre. Redford previously produced four other adaptions of the Leaphorn & Chee series: The Dark Wind (1991), Skinwalkers (2002), Coyote Waits (2003), and A Thief of Time (2004). Calandra serves as showrunner, and Eyre directed the pilot. The series is produced by AMC Networks and Dark Winds Productions. In May 2022, Sanford Bookstaver was announced as an additional director.

In June 2022, AMC renewed the series for a six-episode second season. Billy Luther, who wrote for season 1, will direct an episode of season 2.

Writing 
The writers' room is all Native American. In addition to Roland, writers on the series include Anthony Florez, Maya Rose Dittloff, Razelle Benally, Billy Luther, and Erica Tremblay.

Casting 
Alongside the series announcement, Zahn McClarnon and Kiowa Gordon were cast as Joe Leaphorn and Jim Chee. In August 2021, Noah Emmerich was cast as Whitover. Jessica Matten was cast as Bernadette Manuelito. Rainn Wilson was cast as Devoted Dan in early September. In February 2022, it was revealed that Deanna Allison would make her television acting debut on the show as Leaphorn's wife, Emma.

In the second season, Nicholas Logan and Jeri Ryan joined the cast as Colton Wolf and Rosemary Vines, respectively.

Filming 
Filming began on August 23, 2021, in Santa Fe, New Mexico. Location shoots also occurred in Española, Tesuque Pueblo, Cochiti Pueblo, and the Navajo Nation. In mid-October, the series filmed in Mexican Hat, Monument Valley and Kayenta. Filming was expected to wrap on November 11, 2021.

The second season began filming in November 2022 in Santa Fe and Tesuque Pueblo. The season is set to wrap in March 2023.

Reception

Critical response 
For the first season of Dark Winds, review aggregator website Rotten Tomatoes reported a 100% approval rating with an average rating of 8.1/10, based on 30 reviews. The website's critical consensus reads, "Zahn McClarnon is riveting as a coiled cop in Dark Winds, a solid procedural that derives much of its texture from an underrepresented cultural milieu." Metacritic, which uses a weighted average, assigned a score of 80 out of 100 based on 18 critics, indicating "generally favorable reviews".

The Navajo Times criticized the series for lacking authenticity in its representation of Navajo people and language.

References

External links 
 
 

2022 American television series debuts
Neo-Western television series
Psychological thriller television series
2020s American crime drama television series
2020s Western (genre) television series
Television series set in the 1970s
Television shows filmed in New Mexico
Television shows set in the United States
Television series based on American novels
Television shows about Native Americans
AMC (TV channel) original programming